The 1985 South Australian National Football League season was the 106th season of the top-level Australian rules football competition in South Australia.

Ladder

1985 SANFL Finals

Week 4 (1985 SANFL Grand Final)

Events 

 12 May – Former Hawthorn player Don Scott (footballer) resigns as South Adelaide coach, after Port Adelaide defeat the Panthers 21.16 (142) to 10.15 (75). It is Scott's sixth loss from six games in charge.

References 

SANFL
South Australian National Football League seasons